Wayne Bibble Carr (March 4, 1897 – July 27, 1954) was an American Negro league pitcher in the 1920s.

A native of Henderson, Kentucky, Carr made his Negro leagues debut in 1920 with the St. Louis Giants. He went on to play for several teams through the 1928 season. Carr died in Milwaukee, Wisconsin in 1954 at age 57.

References

External links
 and Baseball-Reference Black Baseball stats and Seamheads

1897 births
1954 deaths
Bacharach Giants players
Baltimore Black Sox players
Brooklyn Royal Giants players
Indianapolis ABCs players
Lincoln Giants players
Newark Stars players
St. Louis Giants players
Washington Potomacs players
Wilmington Potomacs players
Los Angeles White Sox players
20th-century African-American sportspeople
Baseball pitchers